Gustav Sving Helling (born 16 August 2001) is a Norwegian football striker who currently plays for Ørn Horten.

He started his youth career in Sande SK, making his senior debut on the seventh tier in 2017 before joining Mjøndalen's youth ranks in the summer of that year. He was promoted to the senior squad in 2020 and made his Eliteserien debut in August 2020 against Brann. In July 2021 he made his debut for FK Ørn-Horten in the 2021 Norwegian Football Cup.

References

2001 births
Living people
People from Sande, Vestfold
Norwegian footballers
Mjøndalen IF players
FK Ørn-Horten players
Eliteserien players
Association football forwards
Sportspeople from Vestfold og Telemark